Qamhana (also spelled Qomhane) is a Syrian town located in the Hama Subdistrict of the Hama District in Hama Governorate. It is situated immediately west of the Zayn al-Abidin Mountain. According to the Syria Central Bureau of Statistics (CBS), Qamhana had a population of 13,228 in the 2004 census. Its inhabitants are predominantly Sunni Muslims.

References 

Populated places in Hama District